Richardson Lakes is a small group of meltwater lakes located at the foot of Mount Riiser-Larsen on the northwest side, close east of Amundsen Bay. It was photographed in 1956 by ANARE (Australian National Antarctic Research Expeditions) aircraft and first visited in November 1958 by an ANARE party led by G.A. Knuckey. It was named for Sgt. Alan K. Richardson, RAAF, a member of the 1958 RAAF Antarctic Flight at Mawson Station.

References

Lakes of Antarctica
Bodies of water of Enderby Land